The La Roquette Prisons (the Grande Roquette and the Petite Roquette) were prisons in the 11th arrondissement of Paris, on both sides of the . Opened in 1830, they were finally closed in 1974.

History 

In 1826, under Charles X, the decision was taken to build a prison for minor offenders aged 7 to 20 – the age of majority in France was then set at 21. The location is found not far from the Père-Lachaise cemetery, at 143, rue de la Roquette, on part of the grounds of the former convent of the Hospitalières de la Roquette, built in 1690 and closed during the French Revolution in 1789. It is the architect Hippolyte Lebas, creator of the Notre-Dame-de-Lorette church, who is chosen to carry out this project. He was inspired by the plans of the Panopticon by Jeremy Bentham1, to erect a hexagonal prison, inaugurated on 11 September 1830. The Parisians quickly baptized it "la Roquette". The conditions of detention there are particularly difficult and arouse the indignation of certain Parisians.
 
The same year, Louis-Philippe I was alarmed by the increase in the number of prisoners in Paris, and in turn decided to build a prison in Paris (which already had no less than a dozen). The architect François-Christian Gau was then appointed to draw up the plans for the new prison, and submitted his project. It is simple: an enclosure wall surrounding a square building, itself pierced by a central courtyard. He shows his desire to differentiate himself from the prison for young offenders. The contrast will be all the more flagrant as the new remand center will be built on land facing the previous penitentiary centre.

While the construction of the second prison (located at 164–168, rue de la Roquette) was underway, strong protests arose about the confinement of prisoners sentenced to death in these places. Indeed, since 1832, the guillotine has been transferred from the Place de Grève to the Arcueil barrier (or Saint-Jacques barrier, on the current location of the Saint-Jacques metro station), in the south of Paris, and the distance between La Roquette and the Saint-Jacques barrier is about 5 km. The journey is therefore very long between the place of detention and the place of execution.

This second prison was inaugurated on 24 December 1836, and on the same day forty “salad baskets” transported 187 prisoners there, transferred from Bicêtre prison.

The exact name of the new penitentiary is the “Convict Depot”. It is there, in fact, that future convicts will wait before their departure for the Ile de Ré, then for Cayenne or Nouméa. But it is also there that the prisoners condemned to death will stay. And to mark the difference between the two prisons so close, the Parisians give them a distinctive name: the rascals are housed in “la Petite Roquette”, the assassins in “la Grande Roquette”.

References

Defunct prisons in Paris
11th arrondissement of Paris
1830 establishments in France
1974 disestablishments in France